Pachycerus is a genus of true weevils confined to the Palaearctic and African regions.

Description 
The genus includes moderately-sized weevils (6–12 mm).

Partial species list 
 Pachycerus borrae F. Solari 1950
 Pachycerus cordiger (Germar 1818)
 Pachycerus sellatus Faust 1904
 Pachycerus somaliensis Meregalli, 2002

References 

Lixinae